Life with the Lyons was a British radio and television domestic sitcom from the 1950s (1950–1961 on radio, 1955–1960 on television).

Overview
Life with the Lyons featured a real American family. Ben Lyon and his wife Bebe Daniels had settled in London during the Second World War and featured with Vic Oliver in the radio series Hi, Gang! that ran from 1940 to 1949.

Radio
Life With the Lyons followed and, with Ben and Bebe, featured their children Richard and Barbara Lyon. Although scripted, it expanded on real-life events including Barbara's real-life marriage to Russell Turner in 1957. The radio series premiered on 5 November 1950 and ended in 1961 was the first situation comedy in the United Kingdom.

Writers included Jill Allgood, and Bob Block who created the BBC television series Rentaghost.

Molly Weir was their Scottish housekeeper Aggie Macdonald, Doris Rogers the nosy neighbour Florrie Wainwright and Horace Percival played Mr Wimple.

Films
Two feature films both directed by Val Guest were made with the cast of the series between the radio and television versions.  The Lyons' contract called for them to receive a percentage of the film's profits. 
 Life with the Lyons (1954)
 The Lyons in Paris (1955)

Television

The show then transferred to BBC television. It later transferred to ITV, the first series ever to cross the channels.

A 1955 episode was shown on BBC Four on 27 March 2005 as part of the "TV on Trial" season. The episode was not shown "in the clear"viewers had the choice of a version without commentary but with on-screen logos, or with commentary by Roy Hattersley and Kathryn Flett.

Many radio episodes were not kept by the BBC and only three episodes are in the archives; these were on BBC Radio 7 in early 2011. Following this broadcast, the BBC were alerted to a private collection of around 200 episodes owned by Graeme Stevenson in Scotland, and a selection of 14 episodes were rebroadcast on Radio 7's successor BBC Radio 4 Extra between July and December 2011  and rebroadcast at later dates.

Missing TV episodes 
Only six episodes survive in television archives, one from the first series, two each from the third and fourth, and one from the final series.

Other versions
Life With the Lyons also appeared as a play, and in seven Royal Command Performances.

In popular culture
John Lennon and Yoko Ono paid tribute to the show in the naming of their second album, Unfinished Music No.2: Life with the Lions.

In his song "Post World War Two Blues" (Past, Present & Future, 1973), Al Stewart sang, "We were locked up safe and warm from the snow / With 'Life with the Lyons' on the radio ...".

References

External links
 
 
 Life with the Lyons (radio series) at the Internet Archive

BBC Radio comedy programmes
1950 radio programme debuts
1961 radio programme endings
Radio programs adapted into films
1950s British sitcoms
1960s British sitcoms
1955 British television series debuts
1960 British television series endings
BBC television sitcoms
Black-and-white British television shows
English-language television shows
ITV sitcoms
Radio programs about families
Radio programs adapted into television shows
BBC Light Programme programmes